Spring Lake is a town in Sugar Creek Township, Hancock County, Indiana, United States, along Sugar Creek. The population was 218 at the 2010 census.

History
Spring Lake is centered on an artificial lake of the same name, which was completed in about 1885. Spring Lake was laid out as a town in 1912.

Geography
Spring Lake is located at  (39.776823, -85.854347).

Demographics

2010 census
As of the census of 2010, there were 218 people, 95 households, and 67 families living in the town. The racial makeup of the town was 95.9% White, 0.5% African American, 0.5% Native American, 0.5% from other races, and 2.8% from two or more races. Hispanic or Latino of any race were 0.9% of the population.

There were 95 households, of which 24.2% had children under the age of 18 living with them, 56.8% were married couples living together, 7.4% had a female householder with no husband present, 6.3% had a male householder with no wife present, and 29.5% were non-families. 25.3% of all households were made up of individuals, and 9.5% had someone living alone who was 65 years of age or older. The average household size was 2.29 and the average family size was 2.73.

The median age in the town was 47 years. 16.5% of residents were under the age of 18; 7.5% were between the ages of 18 and 24; 22% were from 25 to 44; 33.4% were from 45 to 64; and 20.6% were 65 years of age or older. The gender makeup of the town was 52.8% male and 47.2% female.

2000 census
As of the census of 2000, there were 262 people, 107 households, and 87 families living in the town. The racial makeup of the town was 99.62% White, and 0.38% from two or more races. Hispanic or Latino of any race were 1.15% of the population.

There were 107 households, out of which 23.4% had children under the age of 18 living with them, 70.1% were married couples living together, 6.5% had a female householder with no husband present, and 17.8% were non-families. 17.8% of all households were made up of individuals, and 6.5% had someone living alone who was 65 years of age or older. The average household size was 2.45 and the average family size was 2.72.

In the town, the population was spread out, with 19.5% under the age of 18, 7.3% from 18 to 24, 25.2% from 25 to 44, 32.1% from 45 to 64, and 16.0% who were 65 years of age or older. The median age was 44 years. For every 100 females, there were 109.6 males. For every 100 females age 18 and over, there were 113.1 males.

The median income for a household in the town was $52,222, and the median income for a family was $56,250. Males had a median income of $40,750 versus $26,458 for females. The per capita income for the town was $24,468. About 3.3% of families and 2.7% of the population were below the poverty line, including 8.8% of those under the age of eighteen and none of those 65 or over.

References

Towns in Hancock County, Indiana
Towns in Indiana